The French military mission of 1867-1868 was one of the first foreign military training missions to Japan, and the first sent by France. It was formed by emperor Napoléon III following a request from the Tokugawa shogunate through its emissary to Europe, Shibata Takenaka, with the goal of modernizing the Japanese military.

Shibata was already negotiating the final details of the French support for the construction of the Yokosuka Shipyard, and had additionally requested both the United Kingdom and France to send a military mission for training in Western warfare. The United Kingdom provided support to the Bakufu naval forces through the Tracey Mission.  The French foreign minister Drouyn de Lhuys transmitted the agreement of the French government to provide training to the Shōgun's land based armed forces.

History
The mission left Marseille on November 19, 1866, and arrived in Yokohama on January 14, 1867. They were welcomed on their arrival by Léon Roches and the commander of the French Far East Squadron Admiral Pierre-Gustave Roze.

The military mission was able to train an elite corps of shōgun Tokugawa Yoshinobu, the Denshūtai, for a little more than one year, before the Tokugawa shogunate lost to the Imperial forces in 1868 in the Boshin War. The French military mission was then ordered to leave Japan by decree of the newly installed Meiji Emperor in October 1868.

In contravention of the agreement for all foreign powers to remain neutral in the conflict, Jules Brunet and four of his non-commissioned officers (Fortant, Marlin, Cazeneuve, Bouffier), chose to remain in Japan and continue supporting the Bakufu side. They resigned from the French army, and left for the north of Japan with the remains of the Shogunate's armies in the hope of staging a counter-attack.

The conflict continued until the rebels' defeat at the Battle of Hakodate in May 1869.

Members

The mission consisted of 17 members, under the authority of the Minister of War General Jacques Louis Randon, covering a wide range of expertise: four officers (representing infantry, artillery and cavalry), ten non-commissioned officers and two soldiers. The original mission composed of 15 members, arriving in Japan in January 1867, and was later supplemented with non-commissioned officers Cazeneuve, Jourdan and Michel (February 1868). The mission was headed by staff captain Charles Sulpice Jules Chanoine, at that time an attaché to the military staff of Paris. The members were:

Commander
 Charles Chanoine, captain of the general staff

Instructors

Infantry
 Charles Albert Dubousquet, lieutenant of the 31st line infantry regiment.
 Édouard Messelot, lieutenant of the 20th battalion of chasseurs à pied.
 Jean Marlin, sergeant of the 8th battalion of chasseurs à pied.
 François Bouffier, sergeant of the 8th battalion of chasseurs à pied.
 Henry Ygrec, sergeant of the 31st line infantry regiment.

Artillery
 Jules Brunet, lieutenant of the Horse Artillery Regiment of the Imperial Guard.
 Arthur Fortant, maréchal des logis of the artillery regiment of the Imperial Guard.

Cavalry
 Léon Descharmes, lieutenant of the Dragoons of the Imperial Guard.
 Emile Perussel, maréchal des logis.

Non-Commissioned Officers
 Louis Guttig, corporal.
 Charles Bonnet, chief armorer second class.
 Barthélémy Izard, maréchal des logis, chief artificier of the Horse Artillery Regiment of the Imperial Guard.
 Frédéric Valette, maréchal des logis, wood specialist.
 Jean-Félix Mermet, brigadier, steel specialist.
 André Cazeneuve, brigadier of the Haras impériaux, arrived in May 1867 bringing Napoleon III's gift of 26 arabian horses to shōgun Tokugawa Yoshinobu. Officially joined the mission in February 1868.
 Claude Jourdan, captain of the engineers.
 Charles Michel, sergeant-major of the engineers.

See also
Second French military mission to Japan (1872–80)
Third French military mission to Japan (1884–89)
Fourth French military mission to Japan (1918–19)
Bizen and Sakai, incidents involving Frenchmen in Japan
Léonce Verny

References

 End of the Bakufu and restoration in Hakodate (Japanese: 函館の幕末・維新) 
 French policy in Japan during the closing years of the Tokugawa regime (English), Meron Medzini 
 Polak, Christian. (2001). Soie et lumières: L'âge d'or des échanges franco-japonais (des origines aux années 1950). Tokyo: Chambre de Commerce et d'Industrie Française du Japon, Hachette Fujin Gahōsha (アシェット婦人画報社).
 Polak, Christian. (2002). 絹と光: 知られざる日仏交流100年の歴史 (江戶時代-1950年代) Kinu to hikariō: shirarezaru Nichi-Futsu kōryū 100-nen no rekishi (Edo jidai-1950-nendai). Tokyo: Ashetto Fujin Gahōsha, 2002. ;

External links
The Land of Fire

French Army
Military history of Japan
1867 in France
1868 in France
Military history of France
Military Mission 1867
1867 in Japan
1868 in Japan
1867 in military history
1868 in military history